Pop Goes the Easel is a 1935 short subject directed by Del Lord starring American slapstick comedy team The Three Stooges (Moe Howard, Larry Fine and Jerry Howard). It is the seventh entry in the series released by Columbia Pictures starring the comedians, who released 190 shorts for the studio between 1934 and 1959.

Plot
Unable to find work during the Great Depression, the Stooges are forced to look for jobs. Taking a merchant's brooms to sweep his sidewalk, they are mistaken for thieves by him, and soon find themselves on the run from the police. With a cop chasing them, they flee into an art school, where they are mistaken for art students. They take their first art lessons while hiding from the police, resulting in a climactic clay fight that takes no prisoners (the persistent cop is among the numerous people who get hit). The film ends when three art students break sculptures over the boys' heads, resulting in them being soundly beaten up.

Cast

Credited
 Moe Howard as Moe
 Larry Fine as Larry
 Curly Howard as Curley

Uncredited
 Leo White as French artist
 Bobby Burns as Professor Fuller
 Louis Mason as Detective
 Phyllis Crane as 'The Hunt' model
 Joan Howard Maurer as Girl playing hopscotch
 Billy Engle as Storekeeper
 Phyllis Fine as Girl playing hopscotch
 Harold Breen as Art student
 Bobby Callahan as Art student
 Lew Davis as Art student
 Richard Kening as Art student
 Ellinor Vanderveer as Dignified woman
 Jack Kenney as Laughing art student
 Al Thompson as Man in car
 William Irving (actor) as Man panhandled by Curly
 Grace Goodall as Rich woman in car

Production notes
Pop Goes the Easel marks several Stooge firsts:
Del Lord’s debut as a Stooges director.
Moe holding out his hand to Curly and asks him to "pick out two" fingers. Curly does, and Moe pokes him in the eyes with them. This would be a recurring joke. In addition, the short contains a very rare scene in which Moe delivers a slap in the face to several people at once. At the end of the clay fight scene, Moe stops everyone and asks, "Who started this?!" Larry yells, "YOU did!", to which Moe angrily replies, "Oh, YEAH?!" and, with right hand extended, spins in a counter-clockwise motion, slapping everyone around him.
A clay-throwing fight, a precursor to the classic pie fights which would become a staple of the Stooge films. The first genuine pie fight would appear the following year in Slippery Silks.
Moe holding out his fist to Curly and says, "See that?" When Curly replies, "Yeah," he smacks the fist dismissively, in which it swings in a circle behind Moe's body, over his head, and bops Curly on the head with it.
Curly dressing in drag, a gag that would be revisited in several later Stooge shorts, such as Uncivil Warriors, Movie Maniacs, Whoops, I'm an Indian!, Wee Wee Monsieur, Mutts to You, Oily to Bed, Oily to Rise, Nutty But Nice, Matri-Phony, Micro-Phonies, Uncivil War Birds and Rhythm and Weep.

The title of the film Pop Goes the Easel is a pun on the nursery rhyme "Pop Goes the Weasel", which is used for the one and only time as the opening theme. The film also ends with the tune, as with the ending of Punch Drunks. It was filmed on February 6–11, 1935.

The two girls playing hopscotch on the sidewalk are Larry Fine's daughter, Phyllis (who died in 1989 at age 60) and Moe Howard's daughter, Joan.

A colorized version of Pop Goes the Easel was released in 2006 as part of the DVD collection entitled "Stooges on the Run".

According to the updated version of the book The Three Stooges Scrapbook, there was an alternate clay fight in the script by Jules White. It was listed as unused or edited. A careful viewer of the clay fight can see some places where the two clay battles were filmed and edited to make one battle. Differences include: The female model is standing in the foreground close to the screen at the beginning, but when she's hit with clay she's standing in front of the windows. She's brunette throughout the whole short, but at the ending, her hair is blonde. As the Stooges walk through the studio, there are spots on the wall made from clay. The officer who was chasing them is out cold and struck with a piece of clay, but later is shown getting his toupee knocked off his head (from a thrown piece) as he is throwing clay.

References

External links 
 
 
 Pop Goes the Easel at threestooges.net

1935 films
1935 comedy films
The Three Stooges films
American black-and-white films
Films directed by Del Lord
Columbia Pictures short films
American slapstick comedy films
1930s English-language films
1930s American films